David Hargreaves is the name of:

David Hargreaves (actor) (born 1940), English actor
David Hargreaves (academic) (born 1939), English academic
Dave Hargreaves (1954–2018), English footballer for Accrington Stanley and Blackburn Rovers